Mike McColl Jones OAM, (born 12 August 1937) is a veteran comedy writer for Australian television. He wrote for Graham Kennedy, Don Lane and Bert Newton.

McColl Jones is the author of My Funny Friends and Graham Kennedy Treasures: Friends Remember The King.

References

Australian television personalities
Living people
Australian comedy writers
Place of birth missing (living people)
1937 births